These are the official results of the athletics competition at the 1998 Goodwill Games which took place on July 19–22, 1998 in Uniondale, New York, United States.

Men's results

100 meters
July 21Wind: -1.0 m/s

200 meters
July 19Wind: -0.8 m/s

400 meters
July 21

Note: Antonio Pettigrew's performance was annulled due to his use of performance enhancing drugs. It is unknown if his medal was re-awarded to the next athlete.

800 meters
July 20

Mile
July 21

5000 meters
July 22

10,000 meters
July 21

110 meters hurdles
July 20Wind: +0.9 m/s

400 meters hurdles
July 19

3000 m steeplechase
July 20

4 x 100 meters relay
July 22

4 x 400 meters relay
July 22

Note: The USA's performance was annulled due to Antonio Pettigrew's use of performance enhancing drugs. It is unknown if the medals were re-awarded to the next teams.

20,000 meters walk
July 20

High jump
July 22

Pole vault
July 21

Long jump
July 20

Triple jump
July 20

Shot put
July 19

Discus throw
July 19

Hammer throw
July 22

Javelin throw
July 19

Decathlon
July 19–20

Women's results

100 meters
July 19Wind: -0.8 m/s

200 meters
July 20Wind: +0.4 m/s

400 meters
July 21

800 meters
July 19

Mile
July 20

5000 meters
July 20

10,000 meters
July 20

100 meters hurdles
July 20Wind: +0.2 m/s

400 meters hurdles
July 19

3000 m steeplechase
July 19

4 x 100 meters relay
July 22

4 x 400 meters relay
July 22

10,000 meters walk
July 21

High jump
July 20

Pole vault
July 19

Long jump
July 19

Triple jump
July 19

Shot put
July 19

Discus throw
July 19

Hammer throw
July 21

Javelin throw
July 21

Heptathlon
July 21–22

References

Results

1998
Goodwill Games